Blue is the official mascot of the Indianapolis Colts professional American football team of the National Football League. He is an anthropomorphic blue horse who wears a white Colts jersey with a horseshoe on the front. He was first introduced on September 17, 2006, in the Colts' first home regular season game against the Houston Texans at the RCA Dome, in which they won 43–24. Indianapolis would go on to win Super Bowl XLI at the end of Blue's first season, defeating the Chicago Bears and winning their first Super Bowl since arriving in Indianapolis (second Super Bowl title overall).

Before Blue was introduced, the team had two inflatable football player mascots only known as "#1" and "#2". and before them, they had an anthropomorphic football character known as Spike.

In 2016, the 32 NFL mascots voted for Blue to receive the inaugural NFL Mascot of the Year award. Blue was once again voted Mascot of the Year in 2019. He was also awarded Skit of the Year in 2017, 2018, and 2019, and he represented the Colts at the Pro Bowl in 2009 and 2011.

Blue was inducted into the Mascot Hall of Fame in 2020; the museum and children's center, based in Whiting, Indiana, was founded by David Raymond, who was the original Phillie Phanatic. Blue was the second NFL mascot inducted into the Mascot Hall of Fame, after Kansas City Chiefs' mascot Wolf was inducted in 2006.

Relationships 

Since Peyton Manning has played for both the Denver Broncos and Indianapolis Colts, Blue and the Broncos' mascot, Miles, are portrayed as having a strained relationship. This was particularly obvious in a 2017 Papa John's commercial, where Miles showed signs of aggravation towards Blue while Manning was attempting to introduce each other, causing Blue to be nervous.

References

External links
Blue at The Official Site of the Indianapolis Colts
2017 Papa John's commercial

Indianapolis Colts
National Football League mascots
Horse mascots